Thessalian barbel (Barbus thessalus) is a species of ray-finned fish in the genus Barbus. It is endemic to Greece.

References

Barbus
Freshwater fish of Europe
Endemic fauna of Greece
Taxa named by Alexander I. Stephanidis